SOKO is a franchise of German (ZDF) and Austrian (ORF) police procedural series. 'SOKO' means a 'Special Commission' (German 'Sonderkommission'). Some English-language titles do not contain 'SOKO'. SOKO – Der Prozess is a 2013 German five-part crossover between five ZDF SOKO series. ZDF Enterprises offers 2,060 episodes of the SOKO franchises.

SOKO 5113/SOKO Munich (originally SOKO München 1978–2020)
Solo für Sudmann spinoff (Originally SOKO für Sudmann, 1997)
Leipzig Homicide (originally SOKO Leipzig, since 2001)
SOKO Kitzbühel (2001 - 2022)
Cologne P.D./SOKO Cologne (originally SOKO Köln, since 2003)
SOKO Wismar (since 2004)
SOKO Vienna (originally SOKO Donau/SOKO Wien, since 2005)
Der vierte Mann, a Donau-Leipzig crossover (2019)
SOKO Rhein-Main (2006–2007)
Stuttgart Homicide (originally SOKO Stuttgart, since 2009)
 Hamburg Homicide (originally SOKO Hamburg, since 2018)
Luna & Sophie (originally SOKO Potsdam) (since 2018)

See also 
Scenes of crime officer (SOCO)

References

External links
ZDF
SOKO Franchise

ORF (broadcaster)
Austrian crime television series
German police procedural television series
ZDF original programming
German-language television shows
German television spin-offs
German crime television series